Gerard Ross 'Toys' Norton  (7 September 1915 – 29 October 2004) was a South African recipient of the Victoria Cross, the highest and most prestigious award for gallantry in the face of the enemy that can be awarded to British and Commonwealth forces.

Early life
Educated at Selborne College, East London (where he acquired his nickname) he was a keen sportsman excelling at cricket, rugby and tennis.
After school, he joined Barclays Bank at Umtata. After a short spell in the Johannesburg branch of the bank, he returned to East London. The hostel at Selborne College is named in his honour.

Military career
Norton's peacetime military training was done with the Middelandse Regiment, but after the outbreak of the Second World War he was transferred to the Kaffrarian Rifles in East London. In 1943, he transferred in to the 1/4th Battalion, Hampshire Regiment (later the Royal Hampshire Regiment).

On 31 August 1944 during the attack on Montegridolfo, Italy, Lieutenant Norton's platoon was pinned down by heavy fire. On his own initiative and with complete disregard for his own safety, he advanced alone and attacked the first machine-gun emplacement, killing the crew of three. He then went on to the second position containing two machine-guns and 15 riflemen, and wiped out both machine-gun nests, killing or taking prisoner the remainder of the enemy. Throughout these attacks he was continuously under fire from a self-propelled gun, nevertheless he calmly went on to lead his platoon against the remaining enemy positions.

The award of the Victoria Cross was gazetted on 24 October 1944.

He later achieved the rank of Captain.

Later life
After the war he moved to Rhodesia, where he ran a large tobacco plantation and became a Rhodesian citizen.
Gerard Ross Norton died on 29 October 2004.

Norton was the great-grand nephew of Joshua Norton, a Californian man who proclaimed himself as "Emperor of the United States".

References

British VCs of World War 2 (John Laffin, 1997)
Monuments to Courage (David Harvey, 1999)
The Register of the Victoria Cross (This England, 1997)

External links

Gerard Norton
 
 Victoria Cross
 Burial location
 

1915 births
2004 deaths
People from Senqu Local Municipality
South African World War II recipients of the Victoria Cross
Recipients of the Military Medal
South African military personnel of World War II
South African Army officers
South African people of British descent
White South African people
White Zimbabwean people
South African emigrants to Rhodesia
Alumni of Selborne College